Epipactis phyllanthes, the green-flowered helleborine, is an orchid found in the western Palearctic realm.

Distribution 
It is native to Andorra, Belgium, Portugal, Spain, France, Britain, Ireland, Germany and Denmark.

Habitat 
Its habitats include calcareous substrates in dunes, in scrub, and in beech, oak, and conifer forests.

Reproduction 
Epipactis phyllanthes is thought to be always self-pollinated, with pollination occurring before flowers open.

References

External links 
 Den virtuella floran - Distribution

phyllanthes
Orchids of Europe